Friendship Bridge is a non-profit, non-governmental organization based in Lakewood, Colorado, distributing microcredit to women and children in rural Guatemala since 2000. From 1994 to 2000, the organization distributed loans in Vietnam.

Background 
Founded in 1989, Friendship Bridge was the vision of Dr. Theodore C. Ning, a urologic surgeon and clinical professor of urology at the University of Colorado Health Sciences Center in Denver, and his wife Connie Ning, a psychotherapist.

Operations 
In Guatemala, Friendship Bridge has seven branch agencies providing microfinance to different provincial areas.

Programs 
As of 2007, Friendship Bridge had provided nearly $8 million in loans to women, and more than 21,000 scholarships to their children, in Vietnam and Guatemala.

See also 

 List of non-governmental organizations in Vietnam

References

External links
Friendship Bridge Home Page

Organizations established in 1989
Foreign charities operating in Vietnam
Charities based in Colorado
Microfinance in North America
Foreign charities operating in Guatemala